Charles Alonzo Rich (October 22, 1854 – December 3, 1943) was an American architect who practiced in New York City from 1882 until 1933. Rich was a member of the Architectural League of New York. Rich was a partner in the New York architectural firm of Lamb & Rich, that mostly specialized in residential design.

Personal life
Rich was born in Beverly, Massachusetts, and died at his home in Charlottesville, Virginia, at the age of 89.

Notable buildings
 Claremont Opera House (1897); Claremont, NH, a fine example of Renaissance Revival architecture listed on the National Register of Historic Places in 1973. 
 Milbank, Brinckerhoff, and Fiske Halls (1897-1898), Barnard College; listed on the National Register of Historic Places in 2003.
 Phi Delta Alpha (1902); the first purpose-built fraternity in New Hampshire, and the first fraternity on Dartmouth's "frat row" (Webster Avenue).
 Brooks Hall (1906-1907), Barnard College; listed on the National Register of Historic Places in 2003.
 Copshaholm, the Joseph Doty Oliver mansion in South Bend, Indiana (1895-1896); listed on the National Register of Historic Places and listed as an American Treasure

Notes

1854 births
1943 deaths
19th-century American architects
People from Beverly, Massachusetts
20th-century American architects
Architects from Massachusetts